Shanghai is a series of martial arts action comedy films based on the characters written by Alfred Gough and Miles Millar. The series includes: Shanghai Noon (2000), Shanghai Knights (2003), and the upcoming Shanghai Dawn (TBA). It stars Jackie Chan and Owen Wilson as the Chinese Imperial guard Chon Wang and the American bandit Roy O'Bannon. The series combined has grossed .

Films

Shanghai Noon (2000)

Shanghai Knights (2003)

Shanghai Dawn (TBA)

A third film was meant to be produced under the title Shanghai Dawn. Plans for the film were posted on Jackie Chan's website, but after some news of casting and production plans, no film has been produced. While unconfirmed, it is speculated that the project has been halted indefinitely as there is no news nor release dates. In a February 7, 2003, interview, Owen Wilson said: "We're talking about it maybe starting in Hollywood and then going from there to Africa or the Pyramids... I feel like we have the freedom to take them anywhere in time we want."

On May 14, 2015, MGM announced that they are moving forward with Shanghai Dawn. Jackie Chan, Owen Wilson and Fann Wong are expected to reprise their roles as Chon Wang, Roy O'Bannon and Chon Lin respectively. In September 2016, Jared Hess signed on as director for the film while both Millar and Gough will develop a screen story with Theodore Riley and Aaron Buchsbaum writing the script for the film. As of 2023, there's no information about either the film's progress or its release date.

Principal cast

Crew

Reception

Box office performance

Critical and public response

See also

References

2000 films
2003 films
American action comedy films
American chase films
Kung fu films
2000 Western (genre) films
American Western (genre) comedy films
Films set in China
Films set in Nevada
Martial arts comedy films
Films produced by Roger Birnbaum
2000s buddy films
2000s action comedy films
2000s chase films
Films directed by Tom Dey
Films directed by David Dobkin
Spyglass Entertainment films
Touchstone Pictures films
2000 comedy films
2003 comedy films
2000s English-language films
2000s American films